This is a list of notable films financed by J. Arthur Rank and The Rank Organisation

1930s

1935

1936

1937

1938

1939

1940s

1940

1941

1942

1943

1944

1945

1946

1947

1948

1949

1950s

1950

1951

1952

1953

1954

1955

1956

1957

1958

1959

1960s

1961

1962

1963

1964

1965

1966

1967

1968

1969

1970s

1970

1971-72

1973-74

1975-77

1978

1979

1980s

1990s

Later
Rock-a-Doodle (1991, UK distribution only)
 Four Weddings and a Funeral (1994)
 The Stupids (1996)
 8 Heads in a Duffel Bag (1997)
 Lawn Dogs (1997)

Notes
 

Lists of British films